Starlab is the name given to the planned LEO space station designed by Nanoracks for commercial space activities uses. The company released preliminary plans in October 2021. The main structure of Starlab consists of a large inflatable habitat to be built by Lockheed Martin and a metallic docking node. The station is being designed to support 4 persons in 340 m3 of volume. The station also features a 60 kW power and propulsion element, a large robotic arm for servicing cargo and external payloads. The station is supposed to be operational in 2027. The company has partnered with other companies to realise the project:
 Nanoracks: Nanoracks owns and operates Starlab and GWC Science Park. Nanoracks, a leader in commercial space services, will respond quickly to customer needs and prioritize on-orbit activities;
 Voyager Space: Voyager, the majority stakeholder in Nanoracks;
 Lockheed Martin: Lockheed Martin builds spacecraft systems. The company serves as the technical integrator for Starlab and will develop Starlab’s inflatable habitat module.  After launch, Lockheed Martin will operate the system under Nanoracks’ leadership.
 Airbus: Airbus builds spacecraft systems and is a major contractor with ESA. The company will provide “technical design support and expertise” for Starlab. 

On 2 December 2021, NASA announced it had selected Nanoracks, as one of three companies, to develop designs of space stations and other commercial destinations in space. Nanoracks was awarded $160 million. These Space Act Agreements are the first phase of two with which NASA aims to maintain an uninterrupted U.S. presence in low-Earth orbit by transitioning from the International Space Station to other platforms.

On 4 January 2023, it was announced Airbus would join the Starlab project.  “Working with Airbus we will expand Starlab’s ecosystem to serve the European Space Agency (ESA) and its member state space agencies to continue their microgravity research in LEO,” Dylan Taylor, chairman and chief executive of Voyager Space, said in the announcement.

See also

References

Proposed space stations